Wendy Quirk (born May 29, 1959) is a former competition swimmer who represented Canada in international swimming events during the 1970s.  Quirk won eleven medals in major international swimming championships, spanning the FINA World Championships, Pan American Games and Commonwealth Games.

International career 

In her international debut as a 16-year-old, Quirk represented Canada at the 1975 Pan American Games in Mexico City, where she won a bronze medal for her third-place finish in the 100-metre butterfly.  The following year at the 1976 Summer Olympics in Montreal, Quebec, Quirk placed fifth overall in the 200-metre butterfly, sixth overall in the 100-metre butterfly, and ninth overall in the 400-metre and 800-metre freestyle events.

At the 1978 Commonwealth Games held in Edmonton, Alberta, Quirk won three gold medals in the 100-metre butterfly, 4x100-metre freestyle relay, and the 4x100-metre medley relay, a silver medal in the 200-metre butterfly, and a bronze medal in the 100-metre freestyle.  Later that same year, she won bronze medals for her performances in the 100-metre butterfly and 4x100-metre freestyle relay in the 1978 World Aquatics Championships.  In her final international appearance at the 1979 Pan American Games in San Juan, Puerto Rico, she won a pair of silver medals as a member of the Canadian relay teams in the 4x100-metre freestyle and 4x100-metre medley events, together with two bronze medals in individual events, the 100-metre butterfly and 400-metre freestyle.

College career 

Quirk attended the University of Florida in Gainesville, Florida, where she swam for the Florida Gators swimming and diving team in National Collegiate Athletic Association (NCAA) competition under coach Randy Reese in 1977 and 1978.  During her two-year American college career, she received five All-American honors.  She also attended and graduated from the University of Alberta in Edmonton, Alberta.

See also 

 List of University of Alberta alumni
 List of University of Florida Olympians
 List of World Aquatics Championships medalists in swimming (women)

References

External links 

 Official Results for Wendy Quirk

1959 births
Living people
Anglophone Quebec people
Canadian female butterfly swimmers
Canadian female freestyle swimmers
Florida Gators women's swimmers
Olympic swimmers of Canada
Swimmers from Montreal
Swimmers at the 1974 British Commonwealth Games
Swimmers at the 1975 Pan American Games
Swimmers at the 1976 Summer Olympics
Swimmers at the 1978 Commonwealth Games
Swimmers at the 1979 Pan American Games
World Aquatics Championships medalists in swimming
Commonwealth Games gold medallists for Canada
Commonwealth Games silver medallists for Canada
Commonwealth Games bronze medallists for Canada
Pan American Games silver medalists for Canada
Pan American Games bronze medalists for Canada
Commonwealth Games medallists in swimming
Pan American Games medalists in swimming
Medalists at the 1975 Pan American Games
Medalists at the 1979 Pan American Games
20th-century Canadian women
Medallists at the 1974 British Commonwealth Games
Medallists at the 1978 Commonwealth Games